Saratoga Trunk is a 1945 American Western film (or historical romance film, per the American Film Institute) directed by Sam Wood and starring Gary Cooper, Ingrid Bergman, and Flora Robson. Written by Casey Robinson, based on the novel Saratoga Trunk by Edna Ferber, the film is about a Texas gambler and the daughter of a Creole aristocrat and his beautiful mistress. They become lovers and work together to seek justice from a society that has ruined their parents and rejected them. The title of the film and novel has a dual meaning. Clio says at one point that she thought a Saratoga trunk had to do with luggage, not a railroad line. It meant both. Saratoga trunks were top of the line for elegant travelers.

Plot
New Orleans, 1875. Clio Dulaine returns, plotting revenge. Years earlier, she and her late mother were banished to Paris by her father's family, the Dulaines. Clio's mother was his mistress; Clio was born out of wedlock. His family forced him to marry a woman of his own class. When Rita tried to shoot herself, he intervened. She was accused of murdering him.

Clio has two devoted allies—her maid, Angelique, and a dwarf servant, Cupidon. They restore her mansion on Rampart Street; she assumes the name “Comtesse de Chanfrais”. Clio plans to shame the Dulaines and marry a rich man, but Angelique says Clio is like her mother, grandmother and great-grandmother, fools for love. “They always hope, ladies like her, but never so…”

One Sunday morning, at the market, Clio falls in love at first sight with a tall Texan gambler, Clint Maroon. A furious Angelique whisks Clio away, but they soon meet at Begue's, a famous restaurant, where Clio takes the Dulaine's regular table. The Dulaines recognize her and flee, and Clio invites Clint to sit at her table.

At the house, Clint mistakes her for a prostitute. She slams the door on him. He haunts the house for weeks. Angelique intercepts a letter of apology. At last, Clio goes to church; he kneels beside her. They reconcile and become lovers. Clint has no interest in marriage, even with the girl back home who embroidered his neckties. He promises Angelique that he won't interfere with Clio's plans, because he wants her to be happy, but when she proposes opening a gambling house, he moves on to Saratoga. Clio's obsession with revenge keeps her in New Orleans.

Clio's various efforts to embarrass the Dulaines finally pay off. If Clio leaves New Orleans and gives up the name Dulaine, they will pay her $10,000 and bring her mother's body to New Orleans for burial as “Rita Dulaine, loving wife.”

Clint writes that the resort is “crawling with...respectable millionaires.”  When Clio arrives, railroad heir Bartholomew Van Steed is at the station: Clio sent a telegram in his mother’s name. At the hotel, “Colonel Maroon” offers part of his suite to the Comtesse. Clint watches with amusement as Clio conquers the resort and Van Steed, with help from Sophie Bellop. Clio confesses to Sophie that she is desperate for the respectability and security money can bring. Van Steed's mother arrives, but Sophie  foils her.

Van Steed is enchanted, but he has business problems. In his effort to monopolize railroads, Tycoon Raymond Soule, who destroyed Clint's father,  has hired an army of goons to physically take over Van Steed's Saratoga trunk line. Clint makes the Saratoga shareholders an offer. In exchange for shares in the railroad, he will import a gang of men who are eager to get back at the tycoon who stole their land.

Clint goes to Albany, where Cupidon secretly boards the train. They take back the railroad, station by station. However, Soule sends a train from the end of the line in Binghamton. They crash head on. In the battle that follows, Cupidon is injured protecting Clint.

At Saratoga Springs, Clio dresses for the costume ball. Fearing for Cupidon, Angelique tells her about the plan. Clio accuses Bart of cowardice. He calmly proposes. He knows everything. He uses his mother. He gets what he wants, and he wants Clio. At the ball, men are talking about the success of the battle. Clio is distraught. Clint staggers in, carrying Cupidon, and collapses when Clio hugs him.

Clio is weeping at Clint's bedside, struggling with a piece of embroidery. He pretends to be delirious, speaking to another girl. Clio protests that she has changed, she is like her mother. She loves him.  “Rich and respectable, that's me,” he moans. When she says “I'll let you wear the pants” he declares, “Honey, that's all I wanted to know!” They laugh and kiss, and Angelique drags a laughing Cupidon away from the keyhole.

Cast

Production notes

Ethel Waters and Lena Horne were both considered for the role of Angelique, the Haitian maid. Instead of a woman of color, Warner Bros. cast British actress Flora Robson in dark makeup. This was unusual, as by this time, the use of what was blackface was considered inappropriate and offensive. Shot in 1943, the film was not released until 1945.

Reception

Box office
The film was Warner Bros.' most popular movie of 1946. According to Warner Bros. records, it earned rentals of $5,148,000 in the U.S. and $2,653,000 elsewhere. According to Variety, the film earned $4,250,000 in theatrical rentals through its North American release.

Accolades
At the 19th Academy Awards, Flora Robson was nominated for Best Supporting Actress.

References

External links

 
 
 
 
 Saratoga Trunk on Lux Radio Theater 

1945 films
1945 romantic drama films
1940s historical films
American romantic drama films
American historical films
American Western (genre) films
1945 Western (genre) films
American black-and-white films
Films scored by Max Steiner
Films based on American novels
Films directed by Sam Wood
Films produced by Hal B. Wallis
Films set in New Orleans
Films set in the 1870s
Warner Bros. films
Films based on works by Edna Ferber
1940s English-language films
1940s American films